Gullotta is a surname. Notable people with the surname include:

José Luis Martínez Gullotta (born 1984), Argentine football player
Leo Gullotta (born 1946), Italian actor